Mutela is a genus of freshwater mussels, aquatic bivalve mollusks in the family Iridinidae. Species in this genus have actual siphons, rather than unfused apertures, as do most other freshwater mussels.

Species
Species in the genus Mutela include:
 Mutela alata (Lea, 1864)
 Mutela bourguignati 
 Mutela dubia
 Mutela legumen 
 Mutela nilotica 
 Mutela rostrata

References

External links

 
Taxonomy articles created by Polbot
Bivalve genera
Taxa named by Giovanni Antonio Scopoli